The Lego Batman Movie (Original Motion Picture Soundtrack) is the soundtrack to the 2017 computer-animated film The Lego Batman Movie, which is the second instalment in The Lego Movie franchise. The film is based on the DC Comics superhero Batman, and other primary characters from the DC Universe and the Lego DC Super Heroes' Batman toy line. This is the first and only film in the franchise not to be scored by Mark Mothersbaugh, instead Lorne Balfe scored for the film.  The soundtrack to the film was released by WaterTower Music, through two-disc CD formats and for digital download, on February 3, 2017, a week prior to the film's release. A vinyl edition of the soundtrack was released on May 19, 2017.

Background 
Lorne Balfe was hired to score for the film in June 2016. He previously assisted Hans Zimmer on the music of The Dark Knight trilogy, which is also based on the DC Comics character Batman. The film's director Chris McKay, described the film "as a mixture of how About a Boy, meets director Michael Bay" for which he agreed to be a part of the film. While working on the score Balfe did not think the film as a Batman film, but a "live-action film with Lego characters", and took the approach of a serious film, rather than writing "typical animated film music". Balfe did not use any musical references from previous Batman films, but instead he used Neal Hefti's original theme from the 1960's television series, as he thought "it would be great to hear in the film".

The first of the few themes he had written for the film, is the theme for Robin, who plays a pivotal appearance, as, according to Balfe, "a principal leitmoif or theme was not featured for the character". He had written a song "I Found You" for the character. Balfe used a different approach for the music for other characters, including Joker, where "he has a traveling band with him, the same way in which Henry VIII would have a lute player following him around…" The theme for Joker incorporate sitars, harpsichords and rock guitar. Red Hot Chili Peppers band's principal drummer Chad Smith, played drums for the score. Speaking about Smith's inclusion Balfe had said "it brought a whole different dimension to the score [...] It’s not banging drums; it’s the attitude behind playing them. And he brought the whole opening sequence alive."

Chris McKay initially planned The Lego Batman Movie as a musical film. Speaking to Entertainment Weekly, he said that "I think if we had more time, there would have been a version of this movie that would have been a full musical and had more point of view songs like that for sure. But really, we just wanted people to leave the theater smiling and feel good as Batman embraces these people."

Apart from composition, Balfe also wrote few songs for the film, including "Who's The (Bat) Man" and "I Found You". Hefti's theme from the television series was interpreted for the original song "Who's The (Bat)Man" performed by Fall Out Boy frontman Patrick Stump. The song depicts about the origin story of Bruce Wayne. McKay planned for a standalone original song to Batman as "he loved the idea that Batman fancied himself to be a Marilyn Manson/Trent Reznor type, somewhere between industrial and rap. He saw himself as this warrior poet and writes these earnest, dark-feeling songs". In the initial edit, the team planned to use "Bodies", but Warner Bros. felt that the song was not appropriate for a children's film, hence McKay roped in a team of songwriters to pen down a song for Batman. He initially liked the demo written by DJ Cheapshot which was "really funny, and also cool".

Other songs include: "Man in the Mirror" by Glen Ballard, a remix of "Heroes (We Could Be)" performed by Alesso, and remixed by Hard Rock Sofa and Skidka, "One" by Harry Nilsson and "(I Just) Died in Your Arms" performed by Cutting Crew. "Everything Is Awesome", which was featured in the soundtrack of The Lego Movie, was also included in the soundtrack. This version was performed by Richard Cheese & Lounge Against the Machine. However, the song was not featured in the film.

Track listing

Standard edition 
The soundtrack album to the film was released by WaterTower Music on February 3, 2017, a week before the release. It was accompanied by the lead single "Who's the (Bat) Man" performed by Patrick Stump, also released on the same day as the album. The album was released in digital formats, and also in two-disc CD — the first disc consisting of several original and accompanied songs, whereas the second disc consisted of film score composed by Lorne Balfe.

Vinyl release 
On May 19, 2017, WaterTower Music released the vinyl version of the soundtrack, only consisting the songs from the album. United Record Pressing published the vinyl pressings of the album in four editions: "Batman Edition" (black and yellow split colour), "Robin Red", "Joker Edition" (split purple and green vinyl) and "Batgirl" (lavender vinyl).

Film music not included in the album

Reception 
Gizmodo's James Whitbrook said "While it’s hard to imagine anything that could reach the infectious, earworm-y highs of The Lego Movie’s ‘Everything is Awesome’, some newly-released tracks from The Lego Batman Movie try very hard". Johnny Brayson of Bustle called it as "one of the best movie soundtracks of the year" and further called it as "the perfect accompaniment to the action, humor, and heart on screen, and fans shouldn't expect anything less from this franchise". Writing for Film Stories magazine, Mark Harrison in his review for the collection of Batman soundtracks, singled out on The Lego Movie saying "The LEGO Batman Movie’s soundtrack is designed to capture the conflicting identities of the Dark Knight, with an action score that veers between dramatic and tongue-in-cheek, as well as a bunch of pop-music needle-drops." Screen Rant also praised the soundtrack to The Lego Batman Movie saying "The songs of the Lego version add to its overall appeal and gives it an edge over the Adam West film, no matter how iconic the '60s theme song is."

James Southall of Movie Wave wrote "Its sheer energy as it carries you along is enough to keep the entertainment coming, but there is almost too much packed in, the changes in style sometimes so frequent, the pace so unwaveringly swift, you’re left building up a real sweat just listening to it.  Still – it’s a lot of fun, it brings a frequent smile to the face, and sometimes you can’t ask for more than that." Filmtracks.com wrote "Balfe continues to prove himself a master builder of really impressive, intelligent music for this genre, and his work here is ironically more engaging in most parts than his friend Hans' comparatively serious take on the same world." Sci-fi Bulletin wrote "A magpie of a score that borrows, steals, rewrites and still finds a way to adds its own contribution to the pantheon of Batman scores. Stripped away from the kinetic and colourful on-screen mayhem, you get to appreciate Balfe’s work – a holy satisfying experience."

Chart positions

References 

2010s film soundtrack albums
2017 soundtrack albums
Animated film soundtracks
WaterTower Music soundtracks
Batman film soundtracks
The Lego Movie (franchise)
Electronic soundtracks
Dance music soundtracks
Rock soundtracks
Indie pop soundtracks